The Shire of Cue is a local government area in the Mid West region of Western Australia, about  east-northeast of the port city of Geraldton and about  north-northeast of the state capital, Perth.

History

The Shire of Cue originated as the Cue Road District, which was established on 6 December 1895. Part of the road district separated with the formation of the Mount Magnet Road District on 20 September 1901 and the Mullewa Road District on 11 August 1911.

The road district expanded to include the Cue and Day Dawn townships on 11 October 1912 through the Municipality of Cue and the Municipality of Day Dawn. It was renamed the Cue-Day Dawn Road District at that time.

It reverted to the Cue Road District name on 24 January 1930. It absorbed part of the abolished Nannine Road District on the same day.

On 1 July 1961, it became the Shire of Cue following the passage of the Local Government Act 1960, which reformed all remaining road districts into shires.

Wards
The shire is divided into three wards:

 Cue Ward (5 councillors)
 Daydawn Ward (1 councillor)
 Tuckanarra Ward (1 councillor)

Towns and localities
The towns and localities of the Shire of Cue with population and size figures based on the most recent Australian census:

Ghost towns
Abandoned, former and ghost towns in the Shire of Cue:
 Austin
 Big Bell
 Cuddingwarra
 Day Dawn
 Mainland
 Reedy
 Tuckanarra

Notable councillors
 Con O'Brien, Cue Municipality councillor 1896–1900, mayor 1897–1900; later a state MP
 Richard Burt, Cue Road Board member 1939–1959, chairman 1950–1959; later a state MP
 Cedric Wyatt, Cue shire president early 2000s; Aboriginal leader

Heritage-listed places

As of 2023, 127 places are heritage-listed in the Shire of Cue, of which 19 are on the State Register of Heritage Places, all but one, the Great Fingall Mine office, located in Cue.

References

External links
 

 
Cue